Qorveh (also Romanized as Qurve and Qurveh) is a city and capital of Qorveh County, Kurdistan Province, Iran. At the 2011 census, its population was 136,961

Demographics 
A majority of the population speak Kurdish with an Azerbaijani minority.

References

External links 

Qorveh municipality

Towns and villages in Qorveh County
Cities in Kurdistan Province
Kurdish settlements in Kurdistan Province